Sävedalen is a district ("kommundel") located in Partille Municipality. At west it borders to Gothenburg Municipality and is a suburb of Gothenburg.

The ice-cream company Triumf Glass was founded and have their headquarters in Sävedalen.

History
Earlier the village Ugglum was located here. But when the railway station was opened in 1917, it changed name to Sävedalen for avoiding confusion with Ucklum.

Famous people
The comedian and tv-personality Petra Mede grew up in Sävedalen.

References and sources

External links
Eniro Maps
Information about Sävedalen on Wikimedia Commons

Populated places in Västra Götaland County